Telphusa conviciata is a moth of the family Gelechiidae. It is found in India (Assam).

The wingspan is about 10 mm. The forewings are white with blackish markings. There is an irregular streak extending from the base of the costa along the dorsum and termen to the apex, widest on the dorsum towards the base where it reaches half across wing, then narrow, interrupted on the tornus and triangular-prominent on each side of this, dilated at the apex. A small semi-oval spot is found on the costa before the middle, and narrow semi-oval blotch about two-thirds. The hindwings are light grey.

References

Moths described in 1929
Telphusa
Taxa named by Edward Meyrick